KYXX (94.3 FM) is a radio station broadcasting a classic country music format. Licensed to Ozona, Texas, United States, the station serves the San Angelo area. The station is currently owned by Tenn-Vol Corp.

References

External links

Country radio stations in the United States
YXX